Eddo Stern (born 1972 in Tel Aviv) is a California-based artist and developer known for creating experimental video games, game art and machinima-based works. Stern was a founding member of the physical-computing based collective and artist-run space C-Level. He holds a BA in Electronic Media and Art from University of California at Santa Cruz and an MFA in Art and Integrated Media from California Institute of the Arts. A professor at University of California Los Angeles' Design Media Arts program, he is additionally the director of the UCLA Game Lab.

Career 
Eddo Stern's work has been exhibited in a number of prestigious institutions including but not limited to the Sundance Film Festival, Tate Gallery Liverpool, The Haifa Museum of Art, Museo Reina Sofia, the Walker Art Center, Kunsthalle Düsseldorf, The New Museum, The Rotterdam Film Festival, The Kitchen, The Art Gallery of Ontario, Machine Project, The British Film Institute, and The Adelaide Film Festival.

Projects 
 Vietnam Romance (2015-present). Stern is currently working on a project called Vietnam Romance, which received a UCIRA grant and has been exhibited at Postmasters Gallery, Museum of the Moving Image and Babycastles Gallery in New York City, The Beall Center for Art and Technology at UC Irvine, Indiecade, Royal Ontario Museum, and Northern Spark in Minneapolis. The New York Times called the project "art you can play or watch" and described it as "a seasoned meditation on the relationship between war and gaming." In an article on the presentation of Vietnam Romance at Postmasters Gallery, Indie Game Magazine states that Stern "seeks to reassess the entertainment value of media released about the Vietnam War, in particular, with a large exhibit that blurs the lines between reality and fantasy to a point where they become indistinguishable."
 Best Flamewar Ever (2007). Best Flamewar Ever is a dual channel animation work presenting conversations between Everquest players. Art critic Zehra Jumabhoy describes the players' conversation depicted in ArtForum: "Their discussion of the game rapidly morphs into an excuse to trade insults, revealing the masculinity-obsessed aggression lurking behind even such seemingly innocent flights of fancy."

References 

Living people
1972 births
University of California, Santa Cruz alumni
California Institute of the Arts alumni
UCLA School of the Arts and Architecture faculty
New media artists